Udara blackburnii, the Blackburn's bluet, green Hawaiian blue or Hawaiian blue, is a butterfly in the family Lycaenidae. It is endemic to Hawaii.

The wingspan is 22–29 mm.

The larvae feed on Acacia species (including Acacia koa), Pithecellobium, Samanea saman, Perottetia sandwicensis, Dodonaea viscosa and Pipturus albidus.

Udara blackburni is also known as the Koa Butterfly. It is one of two butterflies that are native to Hawai'i. These butterflies have outer wings that are blue, while their inner wings are green and they are only about an inch in length.

Description and Biology 
These butterflies have a wingspan of about an inch. The upper sides of their wings are blue and they usually display their wings upright to show the underside of their wings which are green. They feed on the flower nectar with their long coiled up proboscis but the caterpillars feed on the Koa tree and the ‘a'ali'i, olomea, and mamaki plants.

Distribution and Habitat 
This species is endemic to Hawai'i and can be found on the islands of Kaua'i, Oahu, Maui, Molaka'i, Lana'i, and Hawai'i Island. The only two islands that don’t have these butterflies are Ni'ihau and Kaho’olawe.

Cultural Significance 
Native insects developed a lot of cultural meaning to Polynesians in the Hawaiian Islands

References

External links
Images of Udara blackburnii
Butterflies and Moths of North America: Udara blackburnii

Udara
Endemic fauna of Hawaii
Butterflies of Oceania
Insects of Hawaii